The Vanuatu national cricket team is the men's team that represents the Vanuatu in international cricket. The team is organised by the Vanuatu Cricket Association, which became an affiliate member of the International Cricket Council (ICC) in 1995 and was promoted to associate status in 2009. Vanuatu made its international debut at the 1979 Pacific Games, at which time the country was still known as the New Hebrides. The majority of the team's matches have come against other members of the ICC East Asia-Pacific region, including both at ICC regional tournaments and at the cricket events at the Pacific Games.

Vanuatu entered the World Cricket League at the 2008 Division Five tournament. The team participated in the WCL system at the 2015 Division Six event, where it placed third. Following the withdrawal of Suriname from the 2016 Division Five tournament, Vanuatu were named as their replacement. After the abolition of the WCL, Vanuatu currently is part of the 2019–22 ICC Cricket World Cup Challenge League.

History

Vanuatu competed in the Pacifica Championships on the two occasions it was held, finishing seventh in 2001 and sixth in 2002. In 2005, they hosted the East Asia/Pacific Cricket Cup, finishing third in the six team competition, therefore missing out on qualification for the 2007 World Cup.
At the East Asia – Pacific Trophy in Auckland, New Zealand, in December 2007, Vanuatu finished second, therefore qualifying through to the World Cricket League Division Five in 2008. In the highly successful 2009 calendar year, Vanuatu defeated Fiji in two One-Day Series in Port Vila as well as claiming the prestigious 2009 ICC EAP Men's Cricket Trophy (Non-World Cricket League) held in Samoa, defeating the hosts in the final.
At a junior level, Vanuatu has finished second to Papua New Guinea in the following competitions:
East Asia – Pacific Under 15 Super 8s, Melbourne, Australia, 2005;
East Asia – Pacific Under 15 Super 8s, Apia, Samoa, 2007;
East Asia – Pacific Under 19 World Cup Qualifying Tournament, Port Vila, Vanuatu, 2007.

Vanuatu finished third in the 2010 ICC World Cricket League Division Eight in Kuwait. This means they stayed in that league for the 2012 competition.

2018–present
At the 2018 ICC World Cricket League Division Four tournament, Vanuatu recorded victories against Bermuda, a former ODI team, and Denmark, which has previously played as high as Division Two. However, they were still relegated to Division Five based on net run rate.

In April 2018, the ICC decided to grant full Twenty20 International (T20I) status to all its members. Therefore, all Twenty20 matches played between Vanuatu and other ICC members since 1 January 2019 has been a full T20I.

Vanuatu made its Twenty20 International debut on 22 March 2019, losing to Papua New Guinea by 8 wickets in the 2018–19 ICC T20 World Cup East Asia-Pacific Qualifier at Amini Park, Port Moresby, Papua New Guinea

After April 2019, Vanuatu played in the 2019–21 ICC Cricket World Cup Challenge League.

In August 2019, Australian Clint McKay was appointed as the interim coach of the team, ahead of the 2019 Malaysia Cricket World Cup Challenge League A tournament.

Tournament history

World Cricket League
2008 Division Five: 12th place – relegated to regional qualifier
2010 Division Eight: 3rd place
2012 Division Eight: Champions – promoted
2013 Division Seven: 2nd place – promoted
2013 Division Six: 3rd place
2015 Division Six: 2nd place – promoted (in place of Suriname, who were disqualified for playing unqualified players)
 2016 Division Five: 4th place – relegated to regional qualifier 
 2017 Division Five: 2nd place – promoted 
 2018 Division Four: 5th place – relegated

EAP 50-over tournaments
2005: 4th place
2007: 2nd place
2009 (Division Two): 1st place

EAP 20-over tournaments
2009: 5th place

Pacific Games
1979: Silver medal
1991: 4th place
2003: 5th place
2011: Bronze medal
2015: Champions
2019: Silver medal

Records and Statistics 

International Match Summary — Vanuatu
 
Last updated 17 March 2023

Twenty20 International 

 Highest team total: 223/5 v Fiji, on 16 March 2023 at Albert Park Ground 1, Suva.
 Highest individual score: 103, Patrick Matautaava v Malaysia, 2 October 2019 at Kinrara Academy Oval, Kuala Lumpur.  
 Best bowling figures in an innings: 5/19, Nalin Nipiko v Papua New Guinea, on 9 July 2019 at Faleata Oval No 3, Apia.

Most T20I runs for Vanuatu

Most T20I wickets for Vanuatu

T20I record versus other nations

Records complete to T20I #2028. Last updated 17 March 2023.

Coaching history
2014–2019:  Shane Deitz (playing coach from 2018)
2019–2020:  Clint McKay (acting)
2020:  Simon Keen
2021–2022:  Jeremy Bray
2022:  Eddie Mansale (acting)
2022–present:  Ben Cameron

See also
 List of Vanuatu Twenty20 International cricketers
 Vanuatu women's national cricket team

References

Cricket in Vanuatu
National cricket teams
Cricket
Vanuatu in international cricket